Natalia Mildenberger (born ) is a retired Argentine volleyball player.

She was part of the Argentina women's national volleyball team at the 2003 FIVB Volleyball World Grand Prix.

At club level she played for GE Buenos Aires.
In 2001, she played in the CEV Champions Cup, for Colussi Sirio Perugia.

References

1978 births
Living people
Argentine women's volleyball players